A duvet, usually called a comforter or (down-filled) quilt in US English, and a doona in Australian English, is a type of bedding consisting of a soft flat bag filled with either down, feathers, wool, cotton, silk, or a synthetic alternative, and is typically protected with a removable cover, analogous to a pillow and pillow case. The term duvet is mainly British, especially in reference to the bedding; when rarely used in US English, it often refers to the cover. Sleepers often use a duvet without a top bed sheet, as the duvet cover can readily be removed and laundered as often as the bottom sheet. Duvets originated in rural Europe and were filled with the down feathers of ducks or geese. The best quality feathers are taken from the eider duck, which is known for its effectiveness as a thermal insulator.

Name
The word duvet is of French origin, meaning "down". Its first known mention in English came in 1759, when Samuel Johnson used it in one of The Idler series of essays. Duvets are often more commonly known by other names outside of Europe.

Australia

Originally called a continental quilt, duvets are commonly referred to in Australia by the generic trademark doona. The Doona brand of duvets were originally manufactured by the Melbourne-based textile company Kimptons and became popular in the 1970s, with the brandname eventually becoming a generic term in Australian English. After a series of mergers and acquisitions, Tontine Group has held the Doona trademark since 1991.

Asia
In Asian countries like India and Pakistan, duvets are known as "ralli quilts" or razai.

Americas
In American English, duvets may be called a comforter; however a comforter is generally used to refer to a slightly different type of bedding that is not as thick, does not have a cover, and is often used over a top sheet.

History
Records show the earliest duvets were made in China, around 3000 B.C. From Viking times, duvets of eider down were used by people on the northern coast of Norway. In the 15th century, featherbeds (mattresses) were used by rich monarchs in continental Europe and in England, though not by their courtiers. From the 16th century, wealthy people all over continental Europe began buying and using feather duvets.

Feather duvets came late to England. Samuel Pepys slept under one on 9th September 1665 while visiting his friend Captain George Cocke, whose wife was from Danzig. Paul Rycaut was among the first to try and promote the duvet in England. Around 1700, he sent six-pound bags of down to his friends with instructions, warning that "the coverlet must be quilted high and in large panes, or otherwise it will not be warme". He also tried to sell them without success.

In the mid-18th century, Thomas Nugent, an Englishman on a grand tour then passing through Westphalia, observed with surprise:

Feather coverings came to be used in England in the mid-19th century, just as feather mattresses became common, and were unsurprisingly known as "continental quilts". They were not, however, universal. Of a British traveller in Germany in the 1930s, it was said that "She even learned to like feather quilts ('they don't seem to know about blankets – perhaps they didn't have them in the middle ages')". Duvets remained uncommon in Britain until the 1960s.

Duvets are the most common form of bed covering, especially in northern Europe. They became popular throughout the world in the late 20th century.

Description

A modern duvet, like a sleeping bag, may be filled with down or feathers of various quality and cost, or silk, wool, cotton, or artificial fibers such as polyester batting.

Duvets can reduce the complexity of making a bed, as they can be used without a top sheet, blankets or quilts or other bed covers. Duvets can be made warmer than blankets without becoming heavy. The duvet itself fits into a specially made cover, usually of cotton or a cotton-polyester blend. The duvet cover can be removed and laundered as often as the bottom sheet and pillow cases. The duvet itself may be cleaned much more rarely, and depending on its contents, may require specialist dry cleaning.

While a comforter is fundamentally the same as a duvet in terms of construction, it is used somewhat differently. In the United States, comforters are used on top of the flat sheet, often without a cover.

Thermal performance (tog rating)
Manufacturers rate the performance of their duvets in togs, a measurement of thermal insulation. This enables the purchaser to select a duvet appropriate to the season: the higher the tog rating, the warmer the duvet.

A few manufacturers have marketed combined duvet set consisting of one 4.5 tog and one 9.0 tog. The light-weight one is for summer and the medium one for spring and autumn; snapped together, 13.5 togs is designed for winter. Manufacturers may also offer up to 15 tog duvets.

In some countries, such as France, the warmth of a duvet is rated in grams per square metre (g/m2) instead of togs. The two systems are incompatible because, for example, a 250 g/m2 polyester filling and a 250 g/m2 feather filling have the same weight but offer different levels of thermal insulation and therefore different tog ratings. However, typical all-season sets are sold as a pair of 200 g/m2 and 300 g/m2 duvets, creating a combined 500 g/m2 winter duvet, which would therefore be expected to match 13.5 togs.

Standards and sizes

Modern manufacturing conventions have resulted in a large number of sizes and standards.

In popular culture
In the story The Princess and the Pea, published in 1835, H.C. Andersen wrote about a princess lying on ten eiderdown duvets. 

The term "duvet day" is used in some countries to describe an allowance of one or more days a year when employees can simply phone in and say that they are not coming in to work, even though they have no leave booked and are not ill. The provision of this benefit became fashionable in the late 1990s with many larger companies in the UK.

In the 1999 American film Fight Club, Tyler Durden regards duvets as pretentious blankets:Do you know what a duvet is? [...] It’s a blanket. It’s just a blanket. Then why do guys like you and I know what a duvet is? Is this essential to our survival in the hunter-gatherer sense of the word? No.

See also
 Fill power
 Futon
 Silk comforter

References

External links

 

Blankets